Haddington Athletic Football Club are a Scottish football club based in Haddington, the county town of East Lothian. Nicknamed the Hi-His, the club were founded in 1939 and play their home matches at Millfield.

In July 2021, Scott Bonar became the manager of the club assisted by Ryan Grant.

History 
After a number of years in the bottom tier of Junior football in the East Region, the club won the South Division in 2014–15 and gained promotion to the second tier. In 2017–18 Haddington achieved their best finish in the East Premier League, finishing 3rd in their final season before moving to the East of Scotland League.

The club gained SFA membership in 2020 after upgrades were made to the ground, which included the addition of floodlights.

Honours
East Of Scotland Football League First Division Conference A champions: 2021–22
East Region South Division champions: 2014–15
Lothians District League Division Two winners: 1998–99
Edinburgh & District League champions: 1956–57
East of Scotland Junior Cup winners: 1940–41, 1956–57, 1972–73
Fife and Lothians Cup winners: 1940
Brown Cup winners: 1958–59
Thornton Shield winners: 1939–40, 1940–41, 1946–47
St Michaels Cup winners: 1949–50, 1958–59
Laidlaw Cup winners: 1978–79

Notable former players

A number of players have used Haddington as a stepping stone to bigger and better things. The following players made the grade in the Senior game:

John Scott to Third Lanark
Johnny Gilhooley to Cowdenbeath
Bobby Wood to Hibernian
Dougie Armstrong and Tom McKenzie to Heart of Midlothian
Alex McCrae to Heart of Midlothian (1941), Charlton Athletic (1947), Middlesbrough (1948), Falkirk (1953) and (as player/manager) Ballymena United (1957). He returned to Falkirk as manager in 1960.

November 2007 saw Polish midfielder Lukasz Rusin become the first Haddington player in recent times to seek success in the higher grade when he joined Brechin City for a short spell. However, his progression was hampered by a persistent injury and Rusin took some time away from the game before returning to Junior football with Spartans for the 2011–12 season

In July 2012, prolific striker Sean Jamieson signed for East Fife after a successful trial period. In two seasons for the Hi His, Jamieson scored 64 times in 72 appearances (three as substitute)

Junior Internationalists
In 1948, Dougie Armstrong became the Club's only Junior internationalist player when he played for Scotland against a Republic of Ireland team.

Current squad 
As of 31 October 2020

References

External links
 Official website
 Facebook
 Twitter

Football clubs in Scotland
Association football clubs established in 1939
Scottish Junior Football Association clubs
1939 establishments in Scotland
East of Scotland Football League teams
Haddington, East Lothian